Plitvička Jezera ( or just Plitvice ; Plitvice Lakes, in English) is a municipality (općina) in central Croatia, in the eastern part of the Lika-Senj county, that lies in and near the eponymous Plitvice Lakes National Park, bisected by the D1 main road (Zagreb–Split). Its total area is 539.08 km2 The main town and seat of the municipality is Korenica. Smaller towns and villages are Bjelopolje, Jezerce, and Ličko Petrovo Selo.

Demographics
According to the 2001 census, its total population was 4,668. The ethnic composition of Plitvička Jezera was 67.3% Croat and 30.5% Serb. In the 2011 census, the population dropped to 4,373, of which 70.11% were Croats and 27.08% were Serbs. The settlements in the municipality are:

 Bjelopolje, population 114
 Čanak, population 53
 Čujića Krčevina, population 8
 Donji Babin Potok, population 
 Donji Vaganac, population 61
 Drakulić Rijeka, population 9
 Gornji Babin Potok, population 
 Gornji Vaganac, population 125
 Gradina Korenička, population 82
 Homoljac, population 21
 Jasikovac, population 28
 Jezerce, population 246
 Kalebovac, population 35
 Kapela Korenička, population 13
 Kompolje Koreničko, population 130
 Končarev Kraj, population 1
 Korana, population 25
 Korenica, population 1 776
 Kozjan, population 0
 Krbavica, population 44
 Ličko Petrovo Selo, population 110
 Mihaljevac, population 44
 Novo Selo Koreničko, population 12
 Oravac, population 23
 Plitvica Selo, population 44
 Plitvička Jezera, population 315
 Plitvički Ljeskovac, population 20
 Poljanak, population 98
 Ponor Korenički, population 3
 Prijeboj, population 12
 Rastovača, population 98
 Rešetar, population 43
 Rudanovac, population 123
 Sertić Poljana, population 12
 Smoljanac, population 245
 Šeganovac, population 10
 Trnavac, population 10
 Tuk Bjelopoljski, population 15
 Vranovača, population 194
 Vrelo Koreničko, population 123
 Vrpile, population 15
 Zaklopača, population 5
 Željava, population 38

History
During the Croatian War of Independence and the Krajina uprising, many areas were mined to stop enemy advances. The area around the Korana Bridge has recently been de-mined, but there are still other areas suspected to be mine contaminated as per reports from the local NGO Croatian Mine Action Centre.

Many local ethnic Serbs left the municipality during the war. Between 1,500-2,000 have returned. According to Human Rights Watch, many of the ethnic Serbian returnees were experiencing higher unemployment rates and being "excluded from work in municipal or town-run services and institutions, including the National Park".

Economy

Plitvice Lakes National Park is a major tourist destination and the area's main source of income, together with arable lands, grazing lands and woods. Due to the Plitvice Lakes National Park's unique geological evolution and beauty, it was entered in the UNESCO world heritage list in 1979. Plitvička Jezera is an underdeveloped municipality which is statistically classified as the First Category Area of Special State Concern by the Government of Croatia.

See also
 Plitvice Lakes National Park
 Plitvice Lakes incident

Notable natives and residents
 Rade Končar (1911–1942) - antifascist, communist and People's Hero of Yugoslavia
 Bogdan Dragović

References

External links

Population Data
Tourist Board of the Municipality of Plitvice Lakes
Plitvice lakes secondary school

Populated places in Lika-Senj County
Municipalities of Croatia

it:Laghi di Plitvice